Dionisio Cornelio Borda (born 12 September 1949) is politician from Paraguay. He was the Minister of Finance of Paraguay twice - under president Nicanor Duarte from August 2003 to May 2005 and under president Fernando Lugo from August 2008 to June 2012.

References

Living people
Finance Ministers of Paraguay
1949 births
Paraguayan economists